Čista Proza (trans. Pure Prose) was a former Yugoslav new wave band from Novi Sad, founded by the Serbian producer and sound engineer Milan Ćirić.

History 
The band was formed during the summer of 1979, when Đorđe Pilipović (bass guitar, vocals) and Milan Ćirić (guitar, vocals) met at Krk where they both performed with their own bands. Moving to Novi Sad, the two started looking for musicians, mainly via newspaper adverts, changing numerous lineups until the arrival of the Stevan Mijučić (vocals, guitar) and the Nandor Bakoš (drums, guitar). For a short period of time, the band's drummer was Ivan Fece "Firchie", who was at the time playing with the band La Strada. Together, they started writing their own material, mainly performing at youth work actions. In 1981, the band had their first notable performance at the Subotica Festival Omladina, which was followed by a series of successful appearances in Zagreb, Belgrade and Novi Sad. The popularity of the band was increased by the band's two-song recording which was broadcast by the major Yugoslav radio stations, and the opportunity to have television appearances.

On the 1982 New Year's Eve, the band performed at the Grok festival in Novi Sad, along with Bulevar, Paraf and Buldogi. After the performance, Bakoš temporarily left the band being firstly replaced by Gradski Magazin member Dragan Kašiković, and then Miroslav Papić (drums). In the meantime, the band started preparing their debut album for which the recording sessions started on Bakoš's return, during March 1983 at the Meta Sound studio. Čista proza, released by PGP-RTB, written and produced by the band themselves, featured eleven songs including the hit "Leto" ("Summer"). Song lyrics were written by Ćirić except for the song "Krug" ("Circle"), written by Pilipović. As guests on the album appeared Zoran Stojšin (keyboards), Fazekaš Tibor (keyboards) i Josip Kovač (saxophone).

After the album release, the band went on a promotional tour, mainly performing in Vojvodina, and started preparing new material for the second studio album. The album recording started in early 1985 at the Barbaro studio in Bukovac, but after the recording of only three songs, due to a quarrel between Pilipović and Ćirić, the band ceased to exist.

Post-breakup 

After the disbandment of Čista Proza, Ćirić opened a studio in Novi Sad and having worked as a producer with acts such as KUD Idijoti, Partibrejkers and Instant Karma, he moved to Netherlands where he worked with numerous bands, also being the Motörhead sound technician for a while. Pilipović started working as a judge in Novi Sad, Bakoš moved to Vienna and became a businessman, and Mijučić founded a marketing company.

Starting in 2017, Milan was experiencing health issues but was still able to run his business. By the end of November 2021, the health issues started to become more severe. On the 29th of November 2021, Milan Ćirić passed away in the Netherlands in the company of his loving wife and children at the age of 70.

Discography 
 Čista proza (1983)

References 

 EX YU ROCK enciklopedija 1960-2006, Janjatović Petar; 
 NS rockopedija, novosadska rock scena 1963-2003, Mijatović Bogomir; Publisher: SWITCH, 2005

External links 
 Čista Proza at YouTube
 Čista Proza at Discogs
 Čista Proza at Last.fm

Serbian new wave musical groups
Musical groups from Novi Sad
Musical groups established in 1979
Musical groups disestablished in 1985